The Iclif Leadership and Governance Centre (Iclif) is non-profit organisation in Kuala Lumpur, Malaysia, dedicated to executive education, research, coaching and advisory services in the areas of leadership development and corporate governance.

Background
Iclif was created and funded by Bank Negara Malaysia (The Central Bank of Malaysia) in 2003 as an independent non-profit organisation. It received a significant funding boost from Bank Negara in 2010 to RM800mil. Iclif's aim is to provide highly practical and relevant executive development and advisory services in Malaysia and globally across all industry and government sectors. As the only organisation in the region that focuses both on leadership and corporate governance, their aim is to deliver holistic and sustainable solutions to their clients.

Iclif has international faculty members that come from elite academic institutions and Fortune 500 companies. They are mostly based in Asia, and conduct applied research in the Asian context.

Iclif's mission is to further the goals of sustainability, performance and good governance.

Originally, Iclif was focused on the financial services industry in Malaysia. However, as national and global economies became more connected, Iclif has since expanded into varied economic sectors across Asia and beyond.

In 2020, The Iclif Leadership and Governance Centre merged with Asia School of Business, forming the ASB Iclif Executive Education Center (Iclif). The mission of Iclif is to provide a broader set of business education offerings to the region and beyond, offered through in-person and online modes.

Programmes 
Iclif promotes leadership development and corporate governance, although it has evolved beyond its initial charter to conduct programmes for Malaysian financial institutions only. Iclif now conducts programmes for all corporations in Malaysia and in neighboring countries including Indonesia, Thailand, Singapore, Hong Kong, India and the Middle East. It also offers custom-built programs to help organizations close knowledge gaps.

Publications 
Iclif's publications focus on Asia-related research, which is in turn used to develop targeted programmes and advisory services. Some notable research efforts include:

Open Source Leadership: Reinventing Management When There's No More Business As Usual

A study of 28 countries with interviews of approximately 16,000 executives, designed to explore leadership challenges in today's workforce. It also explored employee motivation.st Century. The findings are summarised in the book Open Source Leadership, published by McGraw-Hill, New York.

Asian Leadership Index

Approximately 4,000 employees in companies operating across Asia-Pacific were asked about their expectations of leaders, and what their current leaders are missing. The research identified 10 attributes that are important for leadership effectiveness in Asia.

Leadership Energy

A study on Iclif's proprietary concept of Leadership Energy. Over 10,000 randomly selected individuals from 27 countries were asked to answer three questions on leadership and personal success. The same questions were then directed to 500 individuals with exposure to the concept of Leadership Energy. The goal of the research was to determine whether the questions would be answered differently by those with context and education on the discipline. The essence of this research is captured in the article entitled, Quantum Mechanics, Spirituality and Leadership.

Employee Engagement

This research was conducted primarily to establish a differentiated perspective on the conventional concept of employee engagement. A distinct element of this engagement study is that it segmented the views of followers along the performance bell curve recognising that the needs of high performers, average performers and low performers will vary.

Additionally, the study provided insight into leader's expectations of followers and uncovered sources of motivation for performance at the highest level. It also investigated the need for a certain amount of bold, tough and sometimes top-down leadership in achieving breakthrough success.

Corporate Governance: Insurance Sector Report

This study reviews the corporate governance practices of 50 of the largest public listed Asia-Pacific insurance companies by market capitalisation. The report provides practical recommendations for improving corporate governance practices in the insurance sector.

Too Many Bosses, Too Few Leaders

A book written by the current CEO of Iclif, Rajeev Peshawaria, that is a culmination of Iclif's research into the concept of Leadership Energy. It explores how values and a sense of purpose support leadership efforts.

Be the Change

Be The Change is a compilation of short essays drawn from the actual experiences of Iclif's faculty members, as well as the input and challenges faced by participants of Iclif's programmes. It was created as a guide to help leaders address leadership challenges related to personal and enterprise performance.

The Philosophy and Practice of Coaching: Insights and issues for a new era

Written by organisational psychologist, author and executive coach Peter Webb, this book's key premise is recognising ‘the urgent need for wiser leaders to address the challenging issues of our time’, offering two models coaches can use to bring forth greater wisdom in their clients.

Brain-Based Leadership

Taken from decades of research and over 60 publications, this book by author, columnist and leadership coach Dr. Thun Thamrongnawasawat explores the power of the brain and how it applies to leadership. Concepts such as brain functions, energy minimisation, and brain-based leadership matrix are woven through stories of everyday leadership.

Brain-Based Leadership: The Models

A sequel in the Brain-Based series, this book dives deeper into the connections between the brain and leadership. It introduces three comprehensive models: B.A.S.E., S.I.M.G.A.R.D., and F.I.G.H.T to help leaders address challenges of leading self and others. The book insightfully integrates the art and science of leadership.

Developing Leadership Talent

Developing Leadership Talent is an important resource that offers a practical, nuts-and-bolts, framework for putting in place a leadership development system that will help attract and retain an organisation's best talent. Step by step, the authors explain how alignment with strategic organisational goals and purpose, and effective development experiences, are the backbone of sustainable leadership development pipeline.

Summits and Conferences (LESA)

Since 2013, Iclif has organised an annual summit called the Leadership Energy Summit Asia (LESA). The summit features invited international and local speakers, who address the growing need to develop and understand sources of leadership energy in order for contemporary leaders to face today's most pressing challenges.

Iclif Leadership Energy Awards

Each year during the LESA Conference, Iclif recognises individuals who have demonstrated outstanding leadership energy. The Iclif Leadership Energy Awards (ILEA) honour “Leadership Energy Champions”, everyday people who have demonstrated immeasurable perseverance and fortitude in overcoming adversity while pursuing their purpose of betterment. The awards recognise individuals who employ their unique leadership energy to create a positive value for their organisations, communities and the world at large.

Thought Leadership Sessions

The talks are typically held for a small, by-invitation only audience.

List of talks since 2012:

November 2012, Hosted International Monetary Fund's Managing Director Christiane Lagarde
September 2013, Pradeep Pant, Executive Vice President and President, Asia Pacific and Eastern Europe, Middle East & Africa (EEMEA) of Mondelēz International
October 2013, Hosted Prof David Schmittlein, John C Head III Dean MIT Sloan School of Management
April 2015, Prof Linda A Hill, Wallace Brett Donham Professor of Business Administration and the faculty chair of the Leadership Initiative at the Harvard Business School
January 2015, Dame Dr Jane Goodall DBE, pre-eminent primatologist, ethologist, anthropologist, and UN Messenger of Peace
June 2015, Chade-Meng Tan, Google's Jolly Good Fellow, bestselling NY Times author and founder of the One Billion Acts of Kindness, which has been nominated for the Nobel Peace Prize 2015

References

External links 
Iclif Official Website
Articles by the Iclif Faculty

Non-profit organisations based in Malaysia
2003 establishments in Malaysia
Organizations established in 2003
Organisations based in Kuala Lumpur